Harperly Hall (also known as 41 Central Park West) is an apartment building on the Upper West Side of Manhattan, New York City. The building is located along prestigious Central Park West and was built in 1910, it opened in 1911. Cast in the Arts and Crafts style, a rarity for New York City, Harperly Hall was designed by Henry W. Wilkinson. The structure was listed as a contributing property to the U.S. federal government designated Central Park West Historic District in 1982 when the district joined the National Register of Historic Places.

History
Henry Wilhelm Wilkinson, the building's architect, and a group investors purchased the property at the northwest corner of 64th Street and Cntral Park West in 1909. The original group included Wilkinson, decorator Mary Bookwalter, artist Dwight Tryon, humorist Wallace Irwin, and concert manager Loudon Charlton. According to filed corporate papers the goal was to build a co-operative "suitable for artists' studios." The building was named after a manor house in County Durham, England, the Wilkinson's ancestral home.

By March 1910 construction on Harperly Hall was nearing completion, the building represented the first housing co-operative in the Central Park West area. The building officially opened in 1911 with 76 apartments.

Architecture

The building at 41 Central Park West was designed by architect Henry W. Wilkinson. Wilkinson's design is unique from the typical apartment building design of the day. Wilkinson, who had little experience designing apartment-houses, used the Arts and Crafts style liberally, throughout the structure. Though the building is cast mostly in the Arts and Crafts style, a rarity for New York City, it does contain elements of the Neo-Italian Renaissance style.

The facade is brown brick with a limestone base and terra cotta trim. The bricks, rough and mottled, are laid in "undulating lozenges" on the face of the building. This forms a "carpet-like" texture which gives the building a handmade character. Glazed tiles highlight the surface where they provide colorful displays of gold, turquoise and green. The glazed tile work is most likely the work of ceramicist Henry Mercer.

Notable residents
In 1985, singer Madonna and then-husband actor Sean Penn purchased a unit at Harperly Hall. After divorcing from Penn in 1989, she bought two additional units, combining them into a six-bedroom duplex. Madonna's presence at Harperly Hall generated significant publicity for the building, regularly attracting the attention of paparazzi and, according to Scott Durkin, an executive at the Corcoran Group real estate firm, raising the value of other units in the building by 25 percent. In November 2012, Madonna listed the duplex for $23.5 million and sold it for an undisclosed amount several months later.

References

Central Park West Historic District
Residential buildings in Manhattan
Residential buildings on the National Register of Historic Places in Manhattan
Historic district contributing properties in Manhattan
1911 establishments in New York City
Upper West Side
Residential buildings completed in 1911